Atish Dipankar University of Science & Technology, abbreviated as ADUST, is a private university in Uttara, Dhaka, Bangladesh. The university was named after Atish Dipankara Srijnana, the ancient Buddhist scholar.

History
Authorized by Private University Act 1992, the university was established on 18 August 2004, after getting approval from the University Grants Commission Bangladesh. Professor Anwara Begum, first women vice-chancellor in Bangladesh, was founding vice-chancellor of the university.

It had temporary campus in Uttara, Panthapath, Mirpur, Paltan and Banani. In 2017, they moved to their new permanent campus.

On September 11, 2021, Atish Dipankar University of Science and Technology received a certificate for establishing their permanent campus from the Ministry of Education as the fifth university.

Administration

Vice-Chancellors
Here is the list of Vice-Chancellors of Atish Dipankar University of Science and Technology:

Appointed
 Anwara Begum (2004 – 2011)
 Sekul Islam (1 August 2018 – 21 July 2021)
 Md Zahangir Alam (20 January 2022 – Present)

In-charge
 Abul Hossain Sikder (2011 – 2015)
 Dilip Kumar Nath (2015 – 2016)
 Nazrul Islam Khan (2016 – 2018)
 Rafique Uddin Ahmed (22 July 2021 – 20 January 2022)

Board of Trustees
The members of the Board of Trustees are as follows:
 Md. Liaquat Ali Sikder
 Md. Mubarak Hossain
 Prof. M Shaheen Khan
 Imtiaz Ahmed
 Syed Mohammad Hemayet Hossain
 Golam Sarwar Kabir
 Md. Jonayet Ahmed
 Ariful Bari Majumder
 Md. Kamruzzaman
 Firoz Mahmud Hossain
 Tanvir Islam Patoari
 Sultana Parvin
 Selina Begum

Faculties  
The academic programs are related to the Faculty of Arts and Social Science, Faculty of Law, Faculty of Business and Economics, and Faculty of Science and Technology.

Faculty of Arts and Social Science 
Department of English language
Department of Law

Faculty of Business Administration 
Department of Business Administration
Department of Agribusiness

Faculty of Science and Technology                                              
Department of Computer Science
Department of Computer Engineering
Department of Electronic and Telecommunication Engineering (ETE)
Department of Electrical and Electronic Engineering (EEE)
Department of Textile Engineering
Department of Pharmacy

Laboratories of Department of Textile Engineering 
Yarn Manufacturing Lab
Textile Testing and Quality Control Lab
Computer Lab
Fabric Manufacturing Lab-1 (Weaving)
Fabric Manufacturing Lab-2 (Knitting)
Garments Lab
Some of the practical classes are held at other private textile mills, factories and commercial laboratories.

School of Public Health 
Master of Public Health (MPH)

Programs

Undergraduate programs

 Bachelor of Pharmacy
 Bachelor of Arts in English
 Bachelor of Laws (Regular)
 Bachelor of Electrical and Electronic Engineering
 Bachelor of Textile Engineering
 Bachelor of Business Administration

Graduate programs

 Master of Business Administration (MBA & EMBA)
 Master of Business Administration in Agribusiness
 Master of Public Health (MPH)
 Master of Arts in English
 LL. M (Regular)

Achievement
The university's team were the second runner-up at the Robo-Carnival 2016. Later, at Robo-Carnival 2019, they were the first runner-up and got an award under the project show category. At Bangladesh ICT Expo 2018, the university ranked sixth position out of ten. Students from the university were also nominated as Microsoft Campus Ambassadors.

Number of graduates 

The first convocation of December 22, 2008 had 161 students. As of Second convocation on 15 May 2017,  around 11,000 have graduated.

Donation
Dutch-Bangla Bank Limited (DBBL) donated Tk 10 lakh to ADUST. The purpose of the donation was to establish a modern pharmacy lab.

Partnership
On 14 May 2019 the university authority signed an agreement with Narail Express Foundation, which will allow at least twenty students every year to study for 100% free scholarships at the university for the students of Narail for more than next ten years.

References

External links
 
 UGC Profile of Atish Dipankar University of Science & Technology

 
Universities of Uttara
Educational institutions established in 2004
Universities and colleges in Dhaka
Private universities in Bangladesh
2004 establishments in Bangladesh